Keel is a surname.  Notable people with the surname include:

 Adam Keel (1924-2018), Swiss visual artist 
 Aileen Keel (born 1952), Scottish doctor and academic
 Alton G. Keel Jr. (born 1943), American engineer, diplomat and businessman
 Avo Keel (born 1962), Estonian volleyball coach
 Brooks A. Keel, American academic and university president
 Carl Eugen Keel (1885-1961), Swiss Expressionist artist
 Frederick Keel (1871-1954), English composer and singer
 Howard Keel (1919-2004), American actor who starred in classic motion picture musicals
 Johann Joseph Keel (1837-1902), Swiss politician
 John Keel (1930-2009), American author, journalist, and ufologist
 Larry Keel (born 1968), American bluegrass singer and songwriter
 Mary Lou Keel, American judge 
 Philipp Keel, Swiss artist, writer and publisher
 Ron Keel (born 1961), American heavy metal vocalist and guitarist
 Stephen Keel (born 1983), American soccer player
 Thomas Keell (1866-1938), English compositor and journal editor

See also
Kiehl